Daniel Arnold may refer to:

 Dan Arnold (American football) (born 1995), tight end for the Jacksonville Jaguars
 Daniel A. Arnold (born 1965), American scholar and philosopher
 Daniel Arnold (photographer) (born 1980), New York City photographer
 Daniel Arnold (table tennis) (born 1978), German para table tennis player